Oncae or Onkai was a small town in ancient Arcadia. Its name came from Oncus, a son of Apollo. William Smith suggests that the town may be the same as Onceium.

References

Populated places in ancient Arcadia
Former populated places in Greece
Lost ancient cities and towns
Locations in Greek mythology